Eturnagaram Wildlife Sanctuary is  a wildlife sanctuary located in Eturnagaram village in Mulugu district in Telangana, India.

The sanctuary is located near the Maharashtra, Chhattisgarh and Telangana border. It is one of the oldest sanctuaries of Telangana. In the year 1952 on 30 January the erstwhile Hyderabad Government because of its rich bio-diversity declared it as a sanctuary.

The land is undulating from steep slopes to gentle slopes from west to east. Three-quarters of the area consist of a plain while the rest is hilly with many streams and springs. Godavari river passes through the sanctuary. The vegetation here is tropical dry deciduous with teak and other trees of good quality standing  and above. The biennial festival of Sammakka Saralamma Jatara is held in the sanctuary.

Flora and fauna
Flora :
The sanctuary has southern tropical dry deciduous type of teak and its associates like thiruman, maddi, and bamboo, madhuca, terminalia, pterocarpus. and some other things.

Fauna : 
A perennial water source called "Dayyam Vagu", divides the sanctuary into almost two halves. It is home to Tiger, Leopard, Wolf, Dholes, Golden jackals, Sloth bear, Chousingha, Blackbuck, Nilgai, Sambar, Spotted deer, Chinkara, Indian giant squirrels and many kinds of birds. Reptiles like Mugger crocodile, Python, Cobra, Krait, Star.

Park-specific information
Location :  From Warangal, Telangana.

Coverage area : 

Main attractions : Tiger, Panther, Gaur, Sambar, Cheetal, Nilgai, Black Buck.

Best time to visit : October to May

Accommodation : Forest Cottages and Rest House Tadvai, ITDA Guest House at Eturnagaram.

Arrival information :

Research:
The Rev.Dr.J.W.Prakash, Principal of Bishop Jesudasan Junior college of Church of South India (CSI) Mission have done some research and published some articles in various national and international journals.
By rail : Nearest railway station is at Warangal (90 km.) 
By air : Nearest Airport Hyderabad.
By road : BIt is well connected by Road.

Nearby excursions : 
Nearby cities : Warangal

References

Eastern Highlands moist deciduous forests
Wildlife sanctuaries of Telangana
Hanamkonda district
Tourist attractions in Warangal
1952 establishments in India
Protected areas established in 1952